The men's qualification round at the 2011 World Artistic Gymnastics Championships was held on 9 October 2011.

Team

Individual all-around

Floor exercise

Pommel horse

Rings

Vault

Parallel bars

Horizontal bar

References 

2011 World Artistic Gymnastics Championships